Moorgate Halt railway station was opened on 1 January 1912 on the London and North Western Railway route from Stalybridge to Huddersfield. The station was only ever served by trains from Oldham to Delph via Greenfield. The station closed on 2 May 1955 when this service, known locally as the Delph Donkey, was withdrawn. The location of Moorgate Halt is now marked by a foot crossing over the railway at Uppermill, although no trace of the station remains. Nearby can be seen the foundations of Delph Junction signal box, where trains used to receive the token giving them authorisation to enter the single line section to Delph.

References

An Illustrated History of Oldham's Railways by John Hooper

Disused railway stations in the Metropolitan Borough of Oldham
Former London and North Western Railway stations
Railway stations in Great Britain opened in 1912
Railway stations in Great Britain closed in 1955
1912 establishments in England